Jeff Randall may refer to:

Jeff Randall (journalist), (born 1954), a British journalist
Jeff Randall, a fictional detective played by Mike Pratt in the late 1960s TV series Randall and Hopkirk (Deceased)